In Greek mythology, Polyboea (Ancient Greek: ,  meaning "worth much cattle"), is a name that refers to:

 Polyboea, a sister of Hyacinthus who died a virgin and was believed to have been taken to Elysium by Aphrodite, Athena and Artemis, together with her brother. As the sister of Hyacinthus, she was probably a Spartan princess as the daughter of King Amyclas and Diomede, daughter of Lapithes. Her other possible siblings were Argalus, Cynortes, Harpalus, Laodamia (or Leanira), Hegesandra, and in other versions, of Daphne.
 Polyboea, the first wife of Actor.
 Polyboea, daughter of Oecles and Hypermnestra, sister of Iphianeira and Amphiaraus.
 Polyboea, a handmaid of Hecuba, who found the dead body of Polydorus.
 Polyboea, an alternate name for Philonome, wife of Cycnus and stepmother of Tenes.
 Polyboea, an obscure theonym, likely an epithet of Artemis or Persephone.

Notes

References 

 Diodorus Siculus, The Library of History translated by Charles Henry Oldfather. Twelve volumes. Loeb Classical Library. Cambridge, Massachusetts: Harvard University Press; London: William Heinemann, Ltd. 1989. Vol. 3. Books 4.59–8. Online version at Bill Thayer's Web Site
 Diodorus Siculus, Bibliotheca Historica. Vol 1-2. Immanel Bekker. Ludwig Dindorf. Friedrich Vogel. in aedibus B. G. Teubneri. Leipzig. 1888-1890. Greek text available at the Perseus Digital Library.
 Pausanias, Description of Greece with an English Translation by W.H.S. Jones, Litt.D., and H.A. Ormerod, M.A., in 4 Volumes. Cambridge, MA, Harvard University Press; London, William Heinemann Ltd. 1918. . Online version at the Perseus Digital Library
Pausanias, Graeciae Descriptio. 3 vols. Leipzig, Teubner. 1903.  Greek text available at the Perseus Digital Library.

Princesses in Greek mythology
Argive characters in Greek mythology
Laconian characters in Greek mythology
Laconian mythology
Mythology of Argos